Ritzi Jacobi (born Victoria Areclia Gavrilă; 1941 – 19 June 2022) was a Romanian textile artist.

References

1941 births
2022 deaths
Women textile artists
Romanian women artists
Artists from Bucharest